Trinitroethylorthocarbonate also known as TNEOC is an oxidizer with excellent chemical stability. Its explosion point is 238 °C, and it begins to be decomposed at 200 °C. Its explosion heat is 5.797 J/g and specific volume is 694 L/kg. Its structure is closely related to that of trinitroethylorthoformate (TNEOF). Both are highly explosive and very shock-sensitive, and may be dissolved in nitroalkanes to reduce their shock-sensitivity.

Synthesis

Trinitroethanol reacts with carbon tetrachloride under a catalyst of FeCl3.
\underset{Carbon\ tetrachloride}{CCl4} + \underset{Trinitroethanol}{4HOCH2C(NO2)3} ->[\ce{FeCl3}] {TNEOC} + 4HCl

References

Oxidizing agents
Nitro compounds